Dibden Bay is a  biological Site of Special Scientific Interest (SSSI) between Marchwood and Hythe in Hampshire.

Most of this site was formed by deposition of material dredged from Southampton Water. It has been designated an SSSI because it has a nationally important collection of invertebrates, including 21 species which are nationally rare and another 67 which are nationally scarce. The site is also important  because of its nesting lapwings, and there are wintering wildfowl such as wigeon, teal, pintail and mallard.

References

 
Sites of Special Scientific Interest in Hampshire